Anton Wallerstein (28 September 1813 – 26 March 1892) was a German violinist and composer, a prolific writer of popular dances and songs.

Wallerstein was born to poor parents in Dresden. He played the violin from an early age; in 1829 he entered the Dresden Court Orchestra, and in 1832 the Court Orchestra of Hanover, leaving the orchestra in 1841. His playing was said to have much expression and animation.

He was popular as a composer, from 1830 until 1877 producing a great quantity of dance music, chiefly published by Schott & Co of Mainz. There are 275 works with opus numbers. His dances had a prodigious vogue during their day in Germany, France, and England, in all classes of society. Among these are "La Coquette", "Redova Parisienne", "Studentengalopp" and "Erste und lezte Liebe". His songs also were popular, such as "Das Trauerhaus" and "Sehnsucht in die Ferne".

References

External links
 
 "Jenny Lind Polka" by Anton Wallerstein at thesession.org

1813 births
1892 deaths
Musicians from Dresden
19th-century German composers
Jewish composers